Achromatorida is an order of non-pigmented intraerythrocytic parasitic alveolates belonging to the subclass Haemosporidiasina. The order was created by Jacques Euzéby in 1988.

The taxonomy of these organisms has been one of some controversy. Weylon in 1926 grouped many of these genera into the genus Babesia - given what is now known about these genera this was probably an error. Agreement on the organisation of these genera probably cannot be regarded as being settled.

Description

These are minute rounded or pyriform parasites found within erythrocytes, or other circulating or endothelial cells of vertebrates. The parasites reproduce by merogony without oocysts or spores.

The apical complex has a polar ring and rhoptries. A conoid is lacking and most species lack the associated pellicular microtubules.

Flagellae are lacking. The trophozoite stage is separated from erythrocyte by single membrane (in the other groups there usually 2 or more). Vectors include ticks and leeches.

Evolution

Taxonomy
This order is divided into two suborders:

Suborder Babesiina

These are agents of piroplasmosis sensu stricto. The species have been placed into two families.

Family Babesiidae Poche 1913

This family excludes species that undergo schizogony in lymphocytes before parasitizing erythrocytes. these species have been placed in the genus Theileria.

Species in this family have rhoptries, a polar ring and subpellicular tubules in its apical complex. With the exception of the genus Tunetella which infects tortoises, species in this family infect in warm-blooded vertebrates and are transmitted by ticks.

Genus Babesia Starcovici 1893
Genus Echinozoon Garnham 1951
Genus Entopolypoides Mayer 1933
Genus Microbabesia Sohns 1918
Genus Rangelia
Genus Tunetella Brumpt & Lavier 1935

Family Haemohormidiidae Levine 1984

This family includes species that infect marine animals. A notable exception is the genus Serpentoplasma which infects reptiles. Very little is known about most of these genera.

Genus Cardiosporidium Gaver & Stephan 1907
Genus Cristalloidophora Dehorne 1934, Porchet 1978
Genus Dobellia Brumpt 1913
Genus Echinococcidium  Porchet 1978
Genus Globidiellum  Neumann 1909
Genus Haemohormidium Léger & Duboscq 1910
Genus Haematractidium Henry 1910
Genus Joyeuxella Le Calvez 1939
Genus Rhabdospora Landau, Boulard & Houin 1969
Genus Serpentoplasma Pienaar 1962
Genus Spermatobium Eisen 1895
Genus Toxocystis Henry 1910
Genus Trophosphaera du Toit 1938

The genus Nephromyces may also belong to this family.

Suborder Theileriina

These are parasites of erythrocytes and diverse white blood cells with sexual reproduction by exoerythrocytic or by exo- and endoerythrocytic schizogony.

Family Leucocytozoidae
Genus Leucocytozoon  Ziemann 1898
Subgenus Leucocytozoon
Subgenus Akiba

Family Garniidae
Genus Fallisia Lainson, Landau & Shaw 1974
Subgenus Fallisia
Subgenus Plasmodioides
Genus Garnia   Lainson et al 1971 
Genus Progarnia  Lainson 1995

Family Theileriidae (synonym Gonderiidae)
Genus Cytauxzoon  Neitz & Thomas 1948
Genus Theileria Bettencourt, França and Borges 1907
Genus Haematoxenus Uilenberg 1964

Notes

There are also a number of genera of uncertain placement that earlier were provisionally included in this taxon:

Elleipsisoma Franca 1912: This genus is currently placed in the Eimeriorina. Its placement there is unusual given that species in this genus infect erythrocytes.

The families Dactylosomatidae (genera Babesiosoma Jakowski and Nigrelli 1956 and Dactylosoma Labbé 1894) were transferred to the suborder Adeleorina by Boulard et al in 1982. The position of the  Anthemosomatidae (genus Anthemosoma Landau, Boulard and Houin 1969) remains unclear.

The genus Nicollia Franca 1910 is now regarded as a synonym for Babesia.

Cytauxzoon replicates in macrophages rather than in lymphocytes. For this reason may be moved to a new family at some point.

Pirhemocyton was described as a protozoan infecting lizards but the intraerythrocytic inclusions have since been shown to be due to a viral infection.

An additional genus - Chelonplasma - has been described but its taxonomic status is unclear.

Synonyms

The classification of the species in this group is difficult. Over the passage of time several genera have been described only to re classified as being synonyms of previously described genera.

Currently recognised synonyms of the genus Babesia include:

Achromaticus Dionisi 1899
Apiosoma
Babesiella Mesnil 1919
Francaiella Yakimoff 1926
Haematococcus Babes 1888
Luhsia Dschunkowsky 1938
Microsoma Sohns 1918
Nicollia Franca 1910
Patonella Ray & Idnani 1943
Piroplasma Patton 1895
Pyrosoma Smith 1893
Rosiella Nuttall 1912
Sogdianella Schurenkova 1939

Recognised synonyms of the genus Nicollia - which is now itself regarded as a synonym of Babesia - include:

Nuttallia Franca 1909
Smithia Franca 1910

Recognised synonyms of the genus Theileria include:

Gonderia

Notes

Apiosoma is currently the name of a genus of ciliated protozoa also known as Glossatella. Although this genus is pathogenic to fish it has not related to the parasites in this taxon.

Nuttallia Dall 1898 is a genus of sunset clams (Psammobiidae)

References

Apicomplexa orders